An Ecstasy of Fumbling – The Definitive Anthology was the third compilation album by Welsh rock band Budgie. The album contained two discs and featured songs from their first album, Budgie, to their tenth, Deliver Us from Evil. The album also features one rare track, "Beautiful Lies", that has never featured on any other Budgie album, as well as two live tracks.

The title of the album is taken from the Wilfred Owen poem, "Dulce et Decorum est."

Track listing

Personnel
Budgie
 Burke Shelley - bass, vocals (all tracks)
 Tony Bourge - guitar (tracks 1-11 & 13-16)
 John Thomas - guitar (tracks 12 & 17-24)
 Ray Phillips - drums (tracks 1-7)
 Pete Boot - drums (tracks 8 & 9)
 Steve Williams - drums (tracks 10-24)

References

Budgie (band) compilation albums
1996 compilation albums
Albums with cover art by Roger Dean (artist)